William Robertson (born 16 July 1998) is an English cricketer who plays for Jersey. He made his first-class debut on 1 April 2018 for Oxford MCCU against Kent as part of the Marylebone Cricket Club University fixtures.

In April 2018, he was named in Jersey's squad for the 2018 ICC World Cricket League Division Four tournament in Malaysia. In May 2019, he was named in Jersey's squad for the 2019 T20 Inter-Insular Cup against Guernsey. He made his Twenty20 International (T20I) debut for Jersey against Guernsey on 31 May 2019. The same month, he was named in Jersey's squad for the Regional Finals of the 2018–19 ICC T20 World Cup Europe Qualifier tournament in Guernsey.

In September 2019, he was named in Jersey's squad for the 2019 ICC T20 World Cup Qualifier tournament in the United Arab Emirates. In November 2019, he was named in Jersey's squad for the Cricket World Cup Challenge League B tournament in Oman.

References

External links
 

1998 births
Living people
English cricketers
Jersey cricketers
Jersey Twenty20 International cricketers
Oxford MCCU cricketers
Place of birth missing (living people)
English cricketers of the 21st century